Cochylis parallelana is a species of moth of the  family Tortricidae. It is found in the United States, where it has been recorded from coastal California.

Adults have been recorded on wing from April to June and from August to September.

References

Moths described in 1879
Cochylis